Floydada is a city in and the county seat of Floyd County, Texas, United States. This rural community lies on the high plains of the Llano Estacado in West Texas and is sometimes referred to as the Pumpkin Capital of Texas. The population was 3,038 at the 2010 census, down from 3,676 at the 2000 census.

History

According to the Texas State Historical Association, the community of Floydada was originally named "Floyd City". Floydada won the election as county seat over Della Plain. When a post office opened, the name was changed to "Floydada". The meaning of the name is disputed. Some claim it was meant to be "Floydalia" but was garbled in transmission to the U.S. Postal Service, while others insist it is a combination of the county's name and that of James Price's mother, Ada. A third view is that it was formed from Caroline Price's parents, Floyd and Ada.

Floydada became an important railroad junction in 1928, when the Quanah, Acme and Pacific Railway reached the town.

Geography

Floydada is located southwest of the center of Floyd County at  (33.983771, –101.337259). U.S. Route 62 enters from the southwest as Ralls Highway and leads east out of town as Houston Street, while U.S. Route 70 enters from the north as Second Street and joins US 62 to exit town on Houston Street. The two highways lead east together  to Matador. Texas State Highway 207 leads north from Floydada  to Silverton.

The terrain surrounding Floydada consists of level plains that at one time were covered with grassland vegetation and populated with bison. The bison were extirpated, and with the exception of Blanco Canyon, the shortgrass prairie has been replaced by plowed cropland, where cotton, grain sorghum, wheat, and pumpkins are grown.

Climate
The city of Floydada and Floyd County experience all four seasons of weather. Winters are cool and windy with little or no precipitation with the exception of snowfall. Summers experience a more mild wind and moderately high temperatures.

The following is a list of average climate data to give a general idea of the weather in the area. Note these values are averages and estimates. They are not intended to provide precise data in a given time frame.

Demographics

2020 census

As of the 2020 United States census, there were 2,675 people, 1,104 households, and 789 families residing in the city.

2000 census
As of the census of 2000, there were 3,676 people, 1,304 households, and 980 families residing in the city. The population density was 1,811 people per square mile (699/km). There were 1,507 housing units at an average density of 742/sq mi (287/km). The racial makeup of the city was 70.35% White, 4.13% African American, 1.09% Native American, 0.14% Asian, 22.20% from other races, and 2.09% from two or more races. Hispanic or Latino of any race were 51.63% of the population.

There were 1,304 households, out of which 38.7% had children under the age of 18 living with them, 58.8% were married couples living together, 12.7% had a female householder with no husband present, and 24.8% were non-families. 23.5% of all households were made up of individuals, and 13.8% had someone living alone who was 65 years of age or older. The average household size was 2.74 and the average family size was 3.24.

In the city the population was spread out, with 31.6% under the age of 18, 7.8% from 18 to 24, 23.6% from 25 to 44, 20.6% from 45 to 64, and 16.5% who were 65 years of age or older. The median age was 34 years. For every 100 females, there were 91.4 males. For every 100 females age 18 and over, there were 84.6 males.

The median income for a household in the city was $25,429, and the median income for a family was $30,038. Males had a median income of $25,179 versus $17,381 for females. The per capita income for the city was $12,431. About 24.7% of families and 26.5% of the population were below the poverty line, including 36.2% of those under age 18 and 19.7% of those age 65 or over.

Education

The city is served by the Floydada Independent School District. Apple Inc. has teamed up with Floydada to distribute laptop computers to the students and staff of Floydada's Jr. High and High School. In 2007–2008, Floydada was the only town in Texas to be an Apple distinguished school.

Workforce development
Floydada has a number of free training programs provided by the Floydada Professional Development Center and the Floydada Economic Development Corporation (EDC). Employers can access financial assistance for training through the Skills Development Fund and the Self-Sufficiency Fund administered by the Texas Workforce Commission. Local training facilities include Caprock Community Action and the Floydada Technology Center.

The Floydada Technology Center (FTC) began in 2003 and is provided by the Floydada EDC and is housed in the EDC offices at 105 South 5th Street. The Center itself was designed to provide workforce development to both citizens and businesses upon request. It houses a twelve student capacity classroom with an instructor's podium and computer that is attached to a projector. Caprock Community Action was opened in 2002 and operates a learning lab that offers citizens the opportunity to earn their GED.  They are located at 701 E. Lee Street.

Coronado site
They discovered significant evidence that Spanish explorer Francisco Vázquez de Coronado established a major camp there during his search for Quivira, one of the legendary Seven Cities of Gold. The Floyd County Historical Museum in downtown Floydada displays some of the significant artifacts from Coronado's campsite. Also, an historical marker in Blanco Canyon tells of Coronado's expedition, which led through the canyon.

Wind energy development
Floydada is located in what many call the wind corridor of the United States. The wind corridor stretches through the Great Plains from the Texas Panhandle up into Minnesota, including some of the most wind-rich states in the country.

The region is ideal for wind development because of its wind quality, the potential to connect into two different electric grid systems, and the plan scheduled for transmission build-out in the area.

The quality of wind is ranked on a scale of one to seven. In Floyd County the wind ranking is class 4, which is considered good for wind energy development. Texas is served by several electric grid operators. Those operating in the Floyd County area are the Southwest Power Pool (SPP) and the Electric Reliability Council of Texas (ERCOT). It is beneficial for the area to be in such close vicinity to both grids, because it allows for the opportunity to send electricity generated from wind farms either direction. Even though Floyd County is located primarily in the SPP grid, lines can be built in the area that connect to the ERCOT grid. In January 2009 the Public Utility Commission of Texas (PUCT) chose several transmission service providers (TSPs) to construct a build-out of transmission lines across the state of Texas. The purpose of the transmission overhaul was to help harness the wind-rich regions of West Texas and the Texas Panhandle in order to send the energy generated into more populated areas of Texas where the energy can be used. Two TSPs have Floyd County included in their study area, Sharyland Utilities and Wind Energy Transmission Texas (WETT). The Competitive Renewable Energy Zones (CREZ) project in Texas has the potential to help spur wind energy development in Floyd County. Xcel Energy is also making plans to construct a transmission line through Floyd County.

Economy

The region's economy is based on agriculture, but local companies provide services such as custom-built, metal-assembly, irrigation-motor development, efficient rock-crushing systems, and a product called the "Row Stalker".

Notable people

 Price Brookfield (1920–2006), college and professional basketball player
 Max F. Crawford (1938–2010), author
 H. Jeff Kimble, professor of physics at Caltech
 Joe D. Montgomery, Alaska educator and legislator
 Don Williams (1939–2017), country music performer and songwriter
 L. G. Wilson (1924–2001), noted football coach
 Kyle Pierce  (1980–Present), IT  Director, Crooked Oak Public Schools

Nuclear test
As part of the Department of Energy Operation Sculpin, "Floydada" was the code name for a 3 kiloton nuclear test conducted at the Nevada Test Site on August 15, 1991. The town's name inaccurately had been among several western ghost towns comprising the set of code names.

See also
Atchison, Topeka and Santa Fe Railway
Llano Estacado
Mount Blanco
Running Water Draw
White River (Texas)

References

External links

Floydada Chamber of Commerce
Floydada Independent School District
Photos of West Texas and the Llano Estacado 
Floyd County Historical Museum

Cities in Floyd County, Texas
County seats in Texas
Cities in Texas
Populated places established in 1890
1890 establishments in Texas